ABM Zahidul Haq (died 13 September 2008) was a Bangladesh Nationalist Party politician and a Jatiya Sangsad member (MP) representing the Kishoreganj-1 constituency during 1991–1996. He also served as the Deputy Minister of Shipping in the same period. He founded Pakundia Adarsha Mohila College in 1993.

Personal life 

ABM Zahidul Haq was born in a village called Narandi, which is located in Pakundia, Kishoreganj. He earned a good reputation in Pakundia and Hossainpur by establishing many educational institutions and improving the roads and bridges. He was the founder of Pakundia Adarsha Mohila College, the first girls' degree college in Pakundia. He died on 13 September 2008 in Dhaka.

See also 
 Pakundia Adarsha Mohila College

References

2008 deaths
Bangladesh Nationalist Party politicians
People from Kishoreganj District
5th Jatiya Sangsad members
6th Jatiya Sangsad members
Year of birth missing
Place of birth missing
Place of death missing